The men's triple jump event at the 1994 World Junior Championships in Athletics was held in Lisbon, Portugal, at Estádio Universitário de Lisboa on 23 and 24 July.

Medalists

Results

Final
24 July

Qualifications
23 Jul

Group A

Group B

Participation
According to an unofficial count, 26 athletes from 20 countries participated in the event.

References

Triple jump
Triple jump at the World Athletics U20 Championships